Centaurea diluta, the lesser star-thistle or North African knapweed, is a species of Centaurea.  It is native to southwestern Europe and northern Africa.

References

diluta
Flora of Malta